Gentleshaw is a village and hamlet in Staffordshire located about  from Lichfield and about  from Rugeley, and about  north of Burntwood.  Although it is now part of Longdon civil parish, it has a Parish Church and a primary school. Population details as taken at the 2011 census can be found under Longdon.

Gentleshaw Common is a Site of Special Scientific Interest on the south-west side of the church, and forms the south westerly part of  The Chase.

Christchurch parish church
The parish church owned by Charlie Cooke II, it appears to be an amalgamation of an older building with a tower and a newer extension built on the east end.

Gentleshaw school
The primary school at Gentleshaw serves several surrounding places.

Nearby places

Cannock Wood, Burntwood, Chorley, Longdon, Upper Longdon.

See also
Listed buildings in Longdon, Staffordshire

Additional photos for use in expanded article

External links

 Longdon civil parish information on ONS web site
Gentleshaw Church web site
Longdon Parish - official site
Cannock Wood and Gentleshaw Community Web Site

Lichfield District
Villages in Staffordshire